Just for Laughs Gags Asia (Chinese: 好笑王) is a silent comedy/hidden camera television series based on the popular Canadian version of the show Just for Laughs Gags. The first episode of Just for Laughs Gags Asia was aired on Mediacorp Channel 5 on January 12, 2010 at 9.00 pm (+8 GMT). Mediacorp TV has entered into an exclusive agreement with Just for Laughs to co-produce and distribute Just for Laughs Gags for the Asian market.

The show contained 13 episodes that were filmed in Singapore.

Mediacorp Channel 8 aired the Chinese version of the show from May 7, 2010 at 8.00 pm. There are no dubbings as the show had no dialogue.

Disney Channel Asia also aired the show in March 12, 2012.

G4 (Canada) also aired the show in April 4, 2014.

Season(s)

Cast
 Beatrice Chien Ah Chee
 Bee Fong Heng
 Bruce Stevens Matthieu
 Dawn Tam Siew Hong
 Derek Seong
 Elizabeth Widjaja
 Eugene Lincwwd
 Eric Low
 Eunice Ho Xianglin
 Gillian Tay Li Lynn
 Jay Yau Xing Zhe
 Lily Ong Siew Lin
 Peer Metze
 Vasu Dev Veerappa
 Đào Đức Vượng

Episodes
Episode 1
 Noisy Jigg
 Jack in the box
 Airlift
 Grandpa goes down
 Twin feats
 Please come back!
 Head over heels
 Hook, unhook
 Rude stereo / Whistling getto blaster
 Watch the birdie
 The laughing cop
 Wipe on you
 Don't have to be shy / Free flowers
 The cradle strikes back
 Dog with glasses

NOTE: This is Episode 9 on G4TV on Demand.

Episode 2
 Free popcorn
 Blind man's bluff
 The shining
 On guard!
 I lost my husband
 Caught red-handed
 Cake in your face
 Mommy arrested
 Here and there
 Icicle face
 The steak out
 A nail stuck in foot / Nail in foot
 Lunchbreak
 Kissing bikers / Go away

Episode 3
 Head in toilette bowl
 Lovers
 The girl with a razor / Shaving Kirsteen
 Lemonade pee
 Let me see / Justice is blind
 Up your skirt
 Easy on the horn
 Alien
 Get down!
 Wandering wrinkly hands
 See no evil
 Sasquatch!
 Whooping cough
 Golden girl bank robber
 Zoom on cleavage / Zoom on girlfriend
 Brinks' door torn off
 Spilled paint

Episode 4
 The crocodile
 Have you seen this man?
 Who's that girl?
 Uncooperative box
 Policeman jigg
 Slipping box
 The hat trick
 Shovel of shit / The shit hits the fan
 Polariod from hell
 Hand me the money
 The crooked cop
 Falling picture frames
 Little rascal
 Umbrella for all

Episode 5
 Tight fit
 Heavy weight backpack
 The walls / Don't box me in
 Water paint
 Black eye
 Looks like rain / Here comes the rain
 The Scotsman's kilt
 Marching band
 4x4 K.O.
 Knife thrower
 Dancing fool
 Orange blind
 Radioactive
 Kissing policeman
 Smashing glasses

Episode 6
 Wet baseball hit
 Lady & the knife
 Hotdog salesman
 Pow! Pow!
 What did you say?
 Eat like a pigeon
 Blind, my eye
 Underwater businessman
 Dummy love / The pervert
 Rock star
 What's so funny
 Come back Gibbon / Come back, Gabon
 Man in the make-up
 Destroyed desk
 Ball through the window

Episode 7
 Worn map
 Corpse in a carpet
 Walk-in closet
 Earlectricity
 Yummy insects
 I smell a snake
 Bells in your back
 Cash on the run / Running money
 Heavy load / Heavy man
 Hold on tight
 Frog in the water

Episode 8
 Violent ambulance man
 Taxi! Ambulance!
 The joist
 The lady's luggage
 Sick in a convertible
 Bikini man
 Daycare express / Ad-hock kindergarten
 Worms sandwich
 Creepy crawler

Episode 9
 Surprise!
 Farting informant
 Grandpa in the trunk
 Fake money
 Abandoned patient
 The two ninjas
 I'm cracking up
 Hands off
 Crate expectations / Boxing day
 Bong! Ouch!
 Urine sample
 Jackhammer
 Break your neck
 The pie who loved me
 Pickpocket

Episode 10
 Cotton candy
 The only good injun…
 Over the top
 Spilled paint
 Policeman's balls
 Left, right
 Are you talking to me?
 The bear garden
 The knock-out cop
 The forgers / Shredded loot
 Condiments pump / Mustard mis-pump
 Toxic drinking trough
 No strings attached
 Hey! My hat!
 The hug
 Caged lion

Episode 11
 Tight fit
 Nice cream
 Scotch on the booth
 The freeze
 Granny's tin can
 Police calls / Long distance cops
 Beauty and the beard / The switch
 Unsecured lid
 The glass eye
 Hand in hand
 Invisible mess
 Pull up my pants
 Who took my lunch?
 The man I love

Episode 12
 The cuddly toy machine
 The fly
 Shock therapy
 Policeman's laces
 The painters touch
 At ease!
 Walk this way
 Invader from Mars
 Hold down
 Knife demonstration / Knife in hand
 Information contradiction

Episode 13
 Dog knows
 Bowl hold up
 Invisible ink
 Up your piñata
 Smashed fingers
 A fish in a bottle
 Gum and sole
 Enemy mime
 Stuck wheelchair
 What's wrong with this picture
 Tailgating gull / Pigeon's shit / seagull
 The evil fan

External links
Official site
Official DC Asia show page

Singaporean comedy television series
Just for Laughs
2010 Singaporean television series debuts
2010 Singaporean television series endings
Non-Canadian television series based on Canadian television series
Channel 8 (Singapore) original programming
Channel 5 (Singapore) original programming